In 2000, internal auditors raised concerns about fictitious Eurostat's contracts with outside companies and referred the matter to the European Anti-Fraud Office, OLAF. OLAF did not react.
 
In 2001, Paul van Buitenen, whose earlier report had indirectly led to the resignation of the previous Santer Commission, produced a second report, but this at first led to no action, until Hans-Martin Tillack and the press started to take interest in the matter. Questions were asked in the European Parliament, OLAF produced a new report entitled "A vast enterprise for looting community funds" as it was reported by Financial Times on May 16, 2003.

Finally the Prodi Commission acted. Three senior Eurostat officials were removed from their posts and a number of contracts with outside companies were cancelled.

It was alleged that, at least during the 1990s, Eurostat used a double accounting system to transfer large amounts of money to secret bank accounts not monitored by auditors and that the value of some contracts was inflated. Allegedly there was evidence of cronyism and financial irregularities, though no evidence of personal enrichment was found. Between four and five million euro was thought to have been "siphoned off", mostly between 1996 and 2001. Some of the money was recovered.

On July 8, 2008 the European Commission was condemned by the European Court of Justice for several failures of OLAF.
The Commission had to pay €56,000 to two senior Eurostat officials.

See also
Accountability in the European Union
 « Eurostat : une « affaire » peut en cacher une autre », L'Expansion, 20 janvier 2004, in French language  

 "De analyse van de Eurostat fraude", KUL 2005, Baeyens Godelieve, in Dutch language

References

Financial scandals
2000 in the European Union
2001 in the European Union
2003 in the European Union
European Commission